Matej Zatlkaj is a Slovak Magic: The Gathering player and commentator. He is perhaps best known for his second-place finish at Pro Tour Berlin in 2008, and his frequent appearances as part of the video coverage team for European Grand Prix.

Achievements

References 

Living people
Magic: The Gathering players
Sportspeople from Bratislava
Year of birth missing (living people)